Gary Walklin (born 2 February 1944) is a New Zealand cricketer. He played in one List A match for Canterbury in 1973/74.

See also
 List of Canterbury representative cricketers

References

External links
 

1944 births
Living people
New Zealand cricketers
Canterbury cricketers
Cricketers from Christchurch